Andrew Wellman Tennant (born June 15, 1955) is an American screenwriter, film and television director, actor, and dancer.

Early life
Tennant was born June 15, 1955 in Chicago, Illinois and was raised in Flossmoor, Illinois, a suburb of Chicago. His father was Don Tennant, a legendary creative advertising talent with Leo Burnett Agency in Chicago. As a boy, he spent his summers on Old Mission Peninsula in northern Michigan and at Camp Minocqua in northern Wisconsin.  He graduated from Homewood-Flossmoor High School in 1973.  He studied theater under John Houseman at University of Southern California.

Career

Dancing/acting and directorial debut 
In 1978, he was cast as an extra of a dancing role in the musical adaption film Grease starring actor John Travolta and singer/actress Olivia Newton-John. That same year, he was cast as an extra in a dancing role in the musical comedy film adaption of Sgt. Pepper's Lonely Heart's Club Band. His next role as an actor was in the 1979 period comedy film 1941 as Babyface directed by Steven Spielberg featuring the ensemble cast of Dan Aykroyd, Ned Beatty, John Belushi, John Candy, Chrisopher Lee, Toshiro Mifune and Robert Stack. He was cast in the comedy film Midnight Madness as Melio - Blue Team in 1980. He was cast as Boy Greaser in the sequel musical romantic-comedy Grease 2 starring actor Maxwell Caulfield and actress Michelle Pfeiffer in 1982. Tennant quit acting and began writing and producing with his first project being the NBC made-for-television movie Moving Target in 1988 starring actor/comedian Jason Bateman, singer/actress Chynna Phillips and actor Jack Wagner. He branched out to directing, making his directorial debut in 1989 for the ABC coming-of-age comedy-drama series The Wonder Years directing the season 3 episode "Math Class" starring actor Fred Savage. He worked as a director and producer for two episodes of the NBC adaption of the 1980s John Hughes film Ferris Bueller starring actor Charlie Schlatter in 1990. He directed four episodes from season 1 of the Fox sitcom Parker Lewis Can't Lose starring actor Corin Nemac (1990). He directed the TNT made-for-television drama movie Keep the Change starring actor William Petersen in 1992. He directed the unaired pilot episode of the Fox comedy series Bill and Ted's Excellent Adventures a spin-off of the 1980s film series originally starring actor Keanu Reeves in 1992. He directed the made-for-television movie Desperate Choices: To Save My Child starring actress Joanna Kerns and actor Bruce Davison in 1992. He directed an episode of the Fox sitcom Great Scott! starring actor Tobey Maguire in 1992. He directed the made-for-television movie What She Doesn't Know in 1992. He directed the ABC made-for-television drama movie The Amy Fisher Story starring actress Drew Barrymore in 1993. He directed two episodes of the Fox weird western series The Adventures of Brisco County, Jr. starring actor Bruce Campbell in 1993. He directed an episode of the CBS crime/drama series South of Sunset starring actor Glenn Frey in 1993. He directed an episode of the ABC series The Byrds of Paradise starring actor Timothy Busfield in 1994. He directed an episode of the Fox science fiction/fantasy series Sliders starring actor Jerry O'Connell in 1995.

Feature film director 
He made his feature film directorial debut in 1995 with the comedy/family film It Takes Two starring actress/comedienne Kirstie Alley, actor/comedian Steve Guttenberg and actresses Mary-Kate and Ashley Olsen. He directed the romantic comedy film Fools Rush In starring actor/comedian Matthew Perry and actress Salma Hayek in (1997). He directed and wrote the romantic/drama film Ever After: A Cinderella Story re-teaming with Drew Barrymore in (1998). He directed the biographical drama film Anna and the King loosely based on the 1944 novel Anna and the King of Siam, which give a fictionalized account of the diaries of Anna Leonowens starring Oscar-winning actress Jodie Foster and actor Chow Yun-fat in (1999). He directed the romantic/comedy film Sweet Home Alabama starring actress Reese Witherspoon in (2002). He returned to television to directed as well as co-produce an episode of the Fox drama series The American Embassy starring actress Arija Bareikis in (2002). He returned to direct the romantic comedy film Hitch starring Will Smith and Eva Mendes in (2005). He directed the made-for-television Fox movie The Wedding Album starring actor Bruno Campos and actress Tara Summers in (2006). He directed the romantic comedy/adventure film Fool's Gold starring actor Matthew McConaughey and actress Kate Hudson in (2008). He directed the made-for-television movie Operating Instructions in (2009). He directed the action/romantic-comedy film The Bounty Hunter starring actor Gerard Butler and actress Jennifer Aniston in (2010). He directed the made-for-television movie Thunderballs in (2011). He served as an executive producer for the ESPN sports newsmagazine series E:60 earning three Emmy nominations and one win from (2011-2016). He directed an episode of the Amazon Video web series Betas starring actor Joe Dinicol in (2013). He directed the comedy film Wild Oats starring actresses Shirley MacLaine and Jessica Lange in (2016). He directed two episodes of the up-coming Netflix web series The Kominsky Method starring actor Michael Douglas in (2018).

Personal life 
Tennant married Fine Art and Cultural Photographer, Sharon Kay Johnson February 13, 1993. The couple have four children, three of whom are triplets. They currently reside in Los Angeles, California.

Filmography

Film

Television

Acting credits

References

External links 

1955 births
American male dancers
American television directors
Living people
Writers from Chicago
USC School of Dramatic Arts alumni
People from Flossmoor, Illinois
Film directors from Illinois